Winter Hymn Country Hymn Secret Hymn is the fourth album by Canadian post-rock band Do Make Say Think. It was released on October 6, 2003 by Constellation Records.

Track listing

"Outer Inner & Secret", "Horns of a Rabbit", "Fredericia" and "Ontario Plates" recorded January 2003 at the Rockwood 2 Farmhouse in Rockwood, Ontario.
"Hooray! Hooray! Hooray!", "107 Reasons Why", "War on Want" and "It's Gonna Rain" recorded March–May 2003 at th' Schvitz in Toronto, Ontario.
"Auberge le Mouton Noir" recorded March 2003 at the Black Sheep Inn in Wakefield, Quebec.

Personnel

Do Make Say Think
Ohad Benchetrit — guitar, horns, keys
Dave Mitchell — drums
James Payment — drums
Justin Small — guitar, keys
Charles Spearin — guitar, bass, horns, keys

Additional musicians
Brian Cairn — horns
Jay Baird — horns

References

2003 albums
Do Make Say Think albums
Constellation Records (Canada) albums